Hillevi Rombin Schine (September 14, 1933 – June 19, 1996) was a Swedish actress and beauty queen who was crowned as Miss Sweden and is the fourth winner of Miss Universe in 1955. She was crowned Miss Sweden Universe 1955 by Miss Sweden Universe 1954, Ragnhild Olausson. In 1996, she became the first Miss Universe title holder to die.

Biography
She grew up in Uppsala, Uppland, and was the Swedish national decathlon champion before she competed in the pageant. A remarkable athlete, Rombin excelled in gymnastics, track & field, and downhill skiing. After winning the pageant, she left Sweden for Hollywood to fulfill her acting contract with Universal Pictures, part of the prize package as Miss Universe. She studied acting along with John Gavin, Clint Eastwood, and Barbara Eden, among the other contract actors. Universal put her in a couple films, with just one or two lines, to give her some exposure and experience. She was credited for small speaking roles in two films. In The Benny Goodman Story (1955) she asks for an autograph and in Istanbul (1957) she appears as a flight attendant near the film's end.

During her year reign as Miss Universe, while traveling around the U.S., she met her future husband G. David Schine, whose family was in the hotel business and would later himself be in the film and music businesses. She discontinued her acting career to focus on married life, soon starting a large family with Schine. They had six children, and their marriage lasted almost 40 years until their deaths together in 1996.

She, her husband, and one of their sons died in a plane crash in 1996, the result of an engine failure shortly after take-off. She was 62 years old and the first Miss Universe to die. She and her husband and their son are buried together at Westwood Village Memorial Park Cemetery.

Filmography

See also

List of fatalities from aviation accidents

References

External links
Hillevi Rombin at Findagrave
Picture as Miss Universe

"The Official Hillevi Rombin Website"

1933 births
1996 deaths
Accidental deaths in California
Burials at Westwood Village Memorial Park Cemetery
Miss Sweden winners
Miss Universe 1955 contestants
Miss Universe winners
People from Uppsala
Swedish beauty pageant winners
Victims of aviation accidents or incidents in the United States